The New River, also Río Nuevo, is a river in northern Belize. As the longest river that is entirely confined to Belize, it drains primarily the eastern part of the Orange Walk District during its north-northeasterly course and empties into the Chetumal Bay. The river also forms the New River Lagoon, the largest body of fresh water in Belize, just east of the Maya temples of Lamanai. The New River is a habitat for numerous types of fish, birds, as well as crocodiles.

Boat tours are available from several sources. Tours of Lamanai use the river as transportation to reach the site.

External links

Rivers of Belize
Geography of Mesoamerica